Abdul Halim is a Jatiya Party (Ershad) politician and the former Member of Parliament of Jessore-6.

Career
Halim was elected to parliament from Jessore-6 as a Jatiya Party candidate in 1986.

References

Jatiya Party politicians
Living people
4th Jatiya Sangsad members
Year of birth missing (living people)